Beyond Hypothermia may refer to:
 Beyond Hypothermia (album), a compilation album by Cave In
 Beyond Hypothermia (film) aka "Sip si 32 dou" (1996)